Nerf N-Strike is a video game developed by EA Salt Lake and published by Electronic Arts for the Wii. The game is a rail shooter and focuses on the Nerf line of toy dart blasters. It has an optional unique blaster for gameplay called the Nerf Switch Shot EX-3, that can either be used as a real Nerf blaster, or to play the video game. The game uses various blasters created in real life by Nerf.

A sequel, Nerf N-Strike Elite, was released an year later. Both games were compiled in the 2010 release Nerf N-Strike Double Blast Bundle.

Reception

Nerf N-Strike received mixed reviews from critics. On Metacritic, the game holds a score of 66/100 based on 13 reviews. The game received praise for its included blaster, but was criticized for being short and easy as a result of its intended audience being children.

See also
N-Strike – The Nerf Blaster line that inspired this video game.
Nerf N-Strike Elite – The 2009 sequel.
Nerf Arena Blast – The 1999 first-person shooter by Hasbro Interactive.

References

External links

 Engadget: MoProUSA shows off fully integrated Wiimote pistols, tempts investors

2008 video games
Electronic Arts franchises
Electronic Arts games
First-person shooters
Video games based on Hasbro toys
Video games scored by James Dooley (composer)
Wii games
Wii-only games
Wii Zapper games
Advergames
Light guns
Video games developed in the United States